Tu Voz Estéreo is a Colombian anthology series on Caracol Television, produced by Daniel Bautista. Among its initial librettists were Saldarriaga and Julio Ricardo Castaneda. Among its key players were Milena (Catalina Aristizabal) y Alejo (Juan Pablo Espinosa),  after entering Andrea  (María José Martínez Turrini) and Felipe (Ítalo Londeros). Because Italo Londeros left the series, the new speaker was Sebastian (Alejandro Estrada), ex-contestant Protagonistas de novela of RCN Televisión.

Synopsis 
This serial is set in a radio studio, focusing on a program called Tu voz estéreo, Juventud en sintonía. The host, Milena Orozco (Catalina Aristizabal), then Andrea Giraldo (Maria Jose Martinez) listened to young people and their problems. Andrea Milena not only listens, but helps, along with first Alejo (Juan Pablo Espinosa) and then Felipe (Italo Londeros), to solve the problems that often become complaints.

The January 21, 2008, opened the 300th episode and in January 2010, the number 1000, of the fourth season, which had guest stars. It is produced Tu Voz Stereo and continued releasing chapters every day of the week regular hours of 18:00 to 19:00.

Cast 
Current

Former

Special guests

References

External links 
 
 Tu voz estéreo on Canal Caracol

Colombian drama television series
2006 Colombian television series debuts
Caracol Televisión original programming